Prostanthera magnifica, commonly known as magnificent prostanthera, is a species of flowering plant in the family Lamiaceae and is endemic to Western Australia. It is a slender to spreading, erect shrub that has hairy stems, elliptical to narrow egg-shaped leaves and pale mauve or pale blue to pink flowers with prominent dark mauve to purple sepals.

Description
Flowering occurs from August to November.

Taxonomy
Prostanthera magnifica was first formally described in 1943 by Charles Austin Gardner in the Journal of the Royal Society of Western Australia from specimens collected near Mullewa by William Blackall.

Distribution and habitat
Magnificent prostanthera grows on granite outcrops, ironstone hills and rock crevices in the Avon Wheatbelt, Coolgardie, Geraldton Sandplains, Murchison and Yalgoo biogeographic regions of Western Australia.

Conservation status
This mintbush is classified as "not threatened" by the Western Australian Government Department of Parks and Wildlife.

Use in horticulture
Prostanthera magnifica prefers a sunny or partly shaded position in well-drained soil. It is sensitive to both frost and humidity. Propagation is successful from both seed and cuttings, though seed germination is slow. Grafting is often used to produce a longer-living plant with rootstocks  including Westringia fruticosa and Prostanthera striatiflora. The latter gives rise to plants with a longer flowering period and less unwanted growth below the graft.

References

magnifica
Eudicots of Western Australia
Lamiales of Australia
Plants described in 1943
Taxa named by Charles Gardner